The Ambassador of Australia to the Association of South East Asian Nations is an officer of the Australian Department of Foreign Affairs and Trade and the head of the delegation of the Commonwealth of Australia to the Association of South East Asian Nations (ASEAN) in Jakarta, Indonesia. Australia has been in involved with ASEAN since 1974, when it became the first Dialogue Partner to ASEAN, with involvement in the East Asia Summit and the ASEAN Regional Forum.

The position has the rank and status of an Ambassador Extraordinary and Plenipotentiary and the present representative is the third resident Ambassador to ASEAN based in the Embassy of Australia, Jakarta. However the position has existed since September 2008 when an Ambassador resident in Canberra was appointed by Foreign Minister Stephen Smith: "The decision to appoint an Ambassador to ASEAN underscores the importance Australia attaches to ASEAN and our desire to extend Australia's engagement and cooperation with ASEAN and its member nations." The ability for Dialogue partners to appoint Ambassadors to ASEAN only became possible after the completion of the new ASEAN Charter, which was signed in November 2007 and became effective in December 2008.

List of ambassadors

References

External links
Australian Mission to ASEAN

Ambassadors of Australia to ASEAN
Association of South East Asian Nations